Santiago Queirolo (originally named Giacomo), was a Peruvian pisco producer based in Pueblo Libre, a district in Lima.

History
Italian immigrant Santiago Queirolo Raggio arrived in Peru in the 1880s, joining a thriving Italian community that had been developing for years in the city of Lima. Living in Pueblo Libre, then still little more than an agricultural town on the edge of Lima, he sold octopus and other sea food on the street before founding his tavern, Antigua Taberna Queirolo. Here he sold traditional Peruvian Creole food and bottles of wine and Pisco from grapes grown on land he bought around Cañete, south of the city.

Eventually his Pisco outsold his lunches, with Santiago Queirolo becoming a brand name for wines and spirits while the restaurant became only a side business.
Although the Antigua Taberna Queirolo is still in business, it's the Santiago Queirolo warehouse that sees most business. Here, where cases of Pisco are piled you will see restaurateurs and wholesalers placing large orders.
Today you can find Santiago Queirolo wines and spirits in many supermarket or restaurants around the world.

External links
Official website
Santiago Queirolo history and photos

Businesspeople in the drink industry
Peruvian people of Italian descent